Anilios robertsi, also known as Roberts' blind snake, is a species of blind snake that is endemic to Australia. The specific epithet robertsi honours naturalist Lewis Roberts, an honorary consultant of the Queensland Museum and collector of the holotype specimen.

Description
The snake grows to about 29 cm in length. The upper body is purplish-brown, the belly white.

Behaviour
The species is oviparous.

Distribution
The species occurs in the south-eastern Cape York Peninsula in the wet tropics of Far North Queensland. The habitat is open forest dominated by blue gum, brown bloodwood and yellow stringybark. The type locality is Romeo Creek, near Shipton's Flat, some 45 km south of Cooktown.

References

 
robertsi
Snakes of Australia
Reptiles of Queensland
Taxa named by Patrick J. Couper
Taxa named by Jeanette Covacevich
Reptiles described in 1998